The Andorra national rugby union team, nicknamed Els Isards (which is a Pyrenean Chamois) represent Andorra in international rugby union competitions. They play most of their home games in Andorra la Vella, the country's capital, though have had some matches in Foix, which is in France.

They compete in the European Nations Cup, and are currently in the second division. As well as playing numerous friendlies they have also taken part in the qualification stages of the Rugby World Cup, competing in every tournament since 1995.

The national side is ranked 88th in the world, as of 16 January 2023.

History
The first international game that Andorra played was on 8 November 1987 when they took on Luxembourg in the third division of the 1987–89 FIRA Trophy. Andorra would win that match 24–3 to receive their only win in the third division as they lost both games to Bulgaria and the reverse game. After qualifying for the second division in the following year, they would finish bottom of their group which would feature Morocco, Tunisia and Portugal.

Andorra attempted to qualify for the 1995 Rugby World Cup. They competed in the preliminary round in the west group of the European qualification. They defeated Denmark, but lost to Switzerland, and were knocked out.

Andorra also attempted to qualify for the 1999 Rugby World Cup. Andorra started off in Pool 3 of Round 1, and won all four of their fixtures, finishing at the top of the final standings to advance through to Round 2. However they were then knocked out of qualifying after Round 2 coming last in a five team group.

They competed in Pool B of Round 1 in attempting to qualify for the 2003 World Cup, but did not advance to the next stage coming third in a six team group.

The 2007 tournament saw many more fixtures and gained the small nation some greater publicity by playing in the first match of the tournament, beating Norway 76–3. They won a 2 leg match, came third in the ensuing five team group thus qualifying for a further 2 leg playoff, victory in which led to a further five team group in which they were last. Competing with the more populous Moldova, Netherlands, Spain and Poland, having beaten Norway, Hungary, Slovenia and Sweden certainly brought Andorra to the attention of more rugby followers, all in spite of a small population of just 70,000.

Popularity
The popularity of football in Andorra has been on the decline due to a poor record at home and away. This has left room for Andorran rugby to rise out of the shadows. Mainly affected by the fanatical popularity of rugby in southern France, Els Isards continue to impress on the international stage. This has led to the rapid increase in the number of registered players in Andorra. Many are now suggesting that rugby in Andorra has grown to such an extent that it has now become the tiny nation's national sport.

As well as a men's 15 aside team, the men have competed in the European Sevens competition since 2005. In 2005 they won promotion to the next division and in both 2006 and 2007 made the finals of the competition.

Also Andorra have a women's set up. They have only played sevens so far, competing in 2006 and 2007.

Youth rugby in Andorra is less developed and has to date only consisted of training camps.

Men's 15-a-side results

Analysis

Andorra have played friendlies, FIRA competitions and World Cup Qualifiers. The full results list including details of unplayed games can be found below. The various game types can be summarised as follows – note that unfulfilled and defaulted games are NOT included in the analysis although they do count towards the game count in the full list. Also if a game has been both a World Cup and FIRA game then it is only recorded here in the World Cup figures.

Matches against individual teams can be summarised as follows

References

Sources
 IRB
 ITV
 FIRA-AER
 Websites of unions mentioned
 Scrum.com
 Rugbyinternational.net

External links
 Federació Andorrana de Rugby – Official Site
  – Andorran Rugby Fan Site
 Andorra on IRB.com

European national rugby union teams
Rugby union in Andorra
Teams in European Nations Cup (rugby union)
National sports teams of Andorra